The International Theravāda Buddhist Missionary University is on the Dhammapãla Hill, Mayangon Township, in  Yangon, Myanmar. It was inaugurated on 6th waxing moon of Nadaw, 1360 ME (9 December 1998).

Inauguration
The Minister for Religious Affairs, Major-General Sein Htwa, was the chairman of the International Theravada Buddhist Missionary University and responsible for the inauguration.

In September 1998, he welcomed Secretary-l Lt-Gen Khin Nyunt when he visited and explained what was being done in preparation for opening the university. This included processing applications of trainees seeking admission, hiring faculty members and other staff, drawing up curricula, collecting textbooks and teacher's guides, constructing the buildings and preparing for the opening ceremony of the university.

The grand inauguration ceremony was held on 6th waxing moon of Nadaw, 1360 ME (9 December 1998), Wednesday, at the Mahã Pãsãna Cave on Kaba-Aye Hill, Mayangone, Yangon.
In May 1999 at a meeting of the council Sein Htwa noted that the university was new and there had been some difficulties, but they had all been overcome.

Objectives
The objectives are:
 to study and comprehend the canonical texts of Theravada Pitaka as approved successively by the Fifth and Sixth Buddhist Council held in Myanmar.
 to abstain from evil deeds and practice good deeds.
 to promote the four modes of sublime living (Brahma-vihara dhamma) which would lead to the establishment of peaceful and prosperous world and
 to train more missionaries endowed with good morality, to be well-versed in Pitaka literature to have experience in meditation practices.

"Not to do any Evil, to do all Good, To Purify one's mind, This is the teaching of the Buddha."

Admonitions
The admonition of The great Benefactor Sayadaw Mingun Tipitakadhara Bhaddanta Vicittasãrãbhivamsa
 Never act, Speak or think of anything that may harm others.
 Don't use Harsh words. Keep your mind filled with loving-kindness.
 Think good thoughts, do what is right, speak the truth.
 Now is the opportune moment. Use it well until you realise Nibbãna.

Rectors
The late Dr. Bhaddanta Silanandabhivamsa (16 December 1927) was the first rector in International Theravada Buddhist Missionary University. He was regarded as an extraordinarily skilful meditation teacher and well-known scholar. He taught Vipassana meditation, Abhidhamma and other aspects of Theravada Buddhism in English, Myanmar, Pali and Sanskrit. Myanmar government awarded the Doctorate of Literature (2000), Aggamahasaddhammajotikadvaja (1999) and Aggamahapandita (1993) titles. He died on 13 August 2005 in California, USA.

Dr. Bhaddanta Nandamalabhivamsa is the present rector. He was born on 22 March 1940. He was educated at Vipassana Ghandarama Monastery, Maha visuddharama Taik Thit in Mandalay. He passed the religious examinations with distinctions. He got Dhammacariya at the young age of sixteen. Because of his brilliant performance in scriptural studies, he continued to get prestigious titles such as Abhivamsa Cetayangana Pariyatti Dhammacariya Gantavacaka, Abhivamsa Priyatti Sasanahita Dhammacariya and Vinaya Pali Paragu. He got his M.A. from Kelaniya University of Colombo, Sri Lanka, and he received his doctorate from Magadha University in India. He is also the Rector of Sitagu International Buddhist Academy in Sagaing. Because of his experience in scriptural teaching, the government conferred upon him the religious title Aggamaha Gantavacaka Pandita in 1996 and Aggamaha Pandita in 1999.

The present rector, Ashin Chekinda was appointed in 2022.

Faculties
At the ITBMU, there are four faculties comprising the following departments.

Faculty of Pariyatti
 Department of Vinaya Studies
 Department of Suttanta Studies
 Department of Abhidhamma Studies
 Department of Buddhist Culture and History

Faculty of Patipatti
 Department of Vipassana Studies
 Department of Samatha Studies
 Department of Dhammãnuloma Studies

Faculty of Religious and Missionary Works
 Department of  World  Religions
 Department of Research
 Department of Missionary

Faculty of Foreign Language and Translation
 Department of Chinese
 Department of English
 Department of French
 Department of German
 Department of Japanese
 Department of Myanmar Language
 Department of Pali Language

Library
The ITBMU Library has 25,670 books including Pali Text Society's Series, the International Encyclopaedia on Buddhism of 75 volumes, Encyclopedia of Religions and Ethics and latest Buddhist scriptures written by famous Theravada Buddhist monks.

Other libraries
The academic staff and the students have easy access to the Library of the Ministry of Religious Affairs. It is situated in the precinct of Kaba Aye Pagoda close to the International Theravada Buddhist Missionary University campus. The Library holds 45,233 volumes and 12,265 palm leaf manuscripts. Steps are being taken to upgrade the library facilities.

Programmes
One-year diploma and other degree are offered for graduate and post-graduate students. They are as follows:
 One-year diploma course: Diploma in Buddha Dhamma in (B.Dh.)
 Two-years graduate degree course: Bachelor of Arts in Buddha Dhamma: B.A. (B.Dh.)
 Three-years M.A post graduate course: Master of Arts in Buddha Dhamma: M.A. (B.Dh)
 Four-years Ph.D. post graduate course: Doctor of Philosophy in Buddha Dhamma: Ph.D. (B.Dh.)

A one-year diploma course in Buddha Dhamma was introduced in December 1998. Then, diploma conferring ceremonies were successively held for seven years. Diploma certificates have been presented to 192 foreign and local students. The first convocation for B.A. (Buddha Dhamma) degree was held in June 2002. B.A (B.Dh) degree was conferred presented to 192 foreign and local students. M.A. (B.Dh) course was started in 2003.

Academic semester
The first semester starts in June and ends in September. The second semester starts in December and ends in March.

Vacation
April and May in the first semester; in the second semester November and December.

Academic requirements
Anyone regardless of gender, race, religion, and creed, having education qualifications prescribed by the university, can apply for admission. However, students are required to sit for the entrance examination. The entrance test is held the second week of January ( around 9–11 January).

Any applicant for diploma in Buddha Dhamma will have to meet the following requirements:
 Foreign monks, nuns and laymen must have passed at least the matriculation or equivalent.
 Laymen and nuns who are Myanmar citizens must have their first degrees B.A. or B.Sc. Myanmar monks must have passed Dhammacāriya examination. They must be below 45 years old.
 All candidates need to sit for an entrance examination prescribed by the university.
 They should have some knowledge of Theravada Buddhist scriptures. They must be fluent or conversant in spoken and written English.

Materials
 Entrance exam questions
  Entrance exam questions
 Entrance Test Guide
 ITBMU Catalog
   ITBMU Entrance Test Application Form

Getting Visa
The student should go to the embassy where he/she sat for the exam to get a religious visa, not tourist visa. With this religious visa, then the student can come to ITBMU few days before the first semester begins.

Once an international student is admitted to the diploma course, the Ministry of Religious Affairs will take care of one year visa application and its extension. The visa will be extended yearly.

Other expenses
Tuition, boarding and messing for foreign students will be provided free by the university. Travel expenses for joining will not be borne by the university.

References

External links 
 Official website

Theravada
Universities and colleges in Yangon
Seminaries and theological colleges in Myanmar
Buddhist universities and colleges in Myanmar
Religion in Yangon
Educational institutions established in 1998